The Marvel Comics rating system is a system for rating the content of comic books, with regard to appropriateness for different age groups. In 2001, Marvel Comics withdrew from the Comics Code Authority and established its own rating system for its publications. This was precipitated by the CCA refusing approval of the seal due to the strong depiction of violence in X-Force #116, a comic written by Peter Milligan and drawn by Mike Allred. As well, by withdrawing from the CCA, this is seen as a move by editor-in-chief Joe Quesada to lure more high-profile creators to Marvel Comics. Today's ratings are usually found on the comic's UPC box.

System
The Marvel Rating System assigns each comic book one of the following ratings:

ALL AGES – Appropriate for all ages.
T – Appropriate for most readers, but parents are advised that they might want to read before or with younger children. 
T+ TEENS AND UP – Appropriate for teens 13 and above.
PARENTAL ADVISORY – Appropriate for 15 and up. Similar to T+, but featuring more mature themes and/or more graphic imagery. Recommended for teen and adult readers.
EXPLICIT CONTENT – 18+ years old. 
Most Mature Readers books will fall under the MAX imprint (created specifically for mature content titles). MAX and Mature-themed titles will continue to be designed to appear distinct from mainline Marvel titles, with the "MAX: Explicit Content" label very prominently displayed on the cover. MAX titles will not be sold on the newsstand, and they will not be sold to younger readers. It says anything from explicit to non-explicit.

History
The first Marvel rating system was implemented in 2001, following their publishing of an issue of X-Force without the approval of self-regulatory system the Comics Code Authority (CCA). The CCA deemed the issue too violent, and following this, Marvel removed its entire line from the scrutiny of the Comics Code. Their age rating system used the following categories:

ALL AGES
PG (Parental Guidance)
PG+
PARENTAL ADVISORY/EXPLICIT CONTENT

However, the Motion Picture Association of America complained, as it holds a trademark on such classifications as PG and PG-13 (see MPAA film rating system). Marvel thus switched to the following system (by changing the PG ratings):

ALL AGES
PSR (Parental Supervision Recommended)
PSR+
PARENTAL ADVISORY/EXPLICIT CONTENT

Beginning in June 2005, Marvel switched to yet another system:

ALL AGES
A Appropriate for age 9 and up.
T+ SUGGESTED FOR TEEN AND UP
PARENTAL ADVISORY
MAX: EXPLICIT CONTENT

See also
 DC Comics rating system

References

Marvel Comics
Media content ratings systems
2001 introductions